Castlewarren, previously known as Buile (pronounced "Boula"), is a small village in County Kilkenny, Ireland, located some  north of the N10 national primary road at Flagmount.

St. Scuithin's
The Catholic church in the village is dedicated to St.Scuithin. There was an old kiln where the church now stands; the people used to build a makeshift altar in the kiln where mass was celebrated. As time went on they began to build small shelters to protect the women of the congregation during inclement weather. The present church was built in 1829 in the shape of a cross. Castlewarren is a sub-parish of Clara, County Kilkenny.

See also
 List of towns and villages in Ireland

References

Towns and villages in County Kilkenny